Tomás de Toro, O.P. (died 1536) was a Roman Catholic prelate who served as Bishop-Elect of Cartagena (1534–1536).

Biography
Tomás de Toro was born ordained a priest in the Order of Preachers at the Convent of San Esteban de Salamanca. On 24 Apr 1534, he was appointed during the papacy of Pope Clement VII as the first Bishop of Cartagena. His bishopric was brief, for he died two years later, after facing serious struggles with the trustees, headed by Pedro de Heredia, due to its excesses with the Indians. He died in 1536 before he was consecrated as Bishop of Cartagena.

References

External links and additional sources
 (for Chronology of Bishops) 
 (for Chronology of Bishops) 

16th-century Roman Catholic bishops in New Granada
Bishops appointed by Pope Clement VII
Roman Catholic bishops of Cartagena in Colombia
1536 deaths
Dominican bishops